Phoenix, the capital of the U.S. state of Arizona, has 23 buildings standing at least . It is also the tallest building in Arizona. The second-tallest building in the city and the state is the U.S. Bank Center, which rises . Of the 25 tallest buildings in Arizona, 22 are located in Phoenix. However, none of them are among the tallest in the United States.

The history of tall buildings in Phoenix began with the completion in 1924 of the Luhrs Building; the structure rose  and ten floors. The Westward Ho was completed in 1927. This 16-floor,  structure stood as the tallest in Phoenix until 1960. Midtown Phoenix went through a building boom in the early 1960s, resulting in the completion of six high-rises, including the Phoenix Corporate Center and 4000 North Central Avenue. The 1970s brought development back to Downtown Phoenix and saw the completion of five major high-rises, including the two tallest buildings in the city: Chase Tower and the U.S. Bank Center. The next major period of development occurred in both districts and lasted from 1980 to the early 1990s. In this time period, 9 of the city's current 25 tallest buildings were constructed, including Century Link Tower, BMO Tower and Renaissance Square.

While high-rise construction didn’t entirely stop, development slowed considerably until 2007 when Downtown gained five more high-rises within three years, including the 1,000-room Sheraton Grand Phoenix and the 34-story 44 Monroe apartment tower.

Currently, the Downtown Phoenix skyline is growing at a rapid pace with dozens of high-rises under construction, approved or proposed.



Tallest buildings

Number of completed buildings in the specified height range. 

This lists ranks Phoenix buildings that exceed a height of 61 m (200 ft) including spires and architectural details, but not antenna masts.

Tallest under construction, approved, and proposed
Number of under construction, approved, or proposed buildings in the specified height range.

Tallest buildings: site prep or under construction
As of January 2023, there are 11 high-rise buildings that are under construction or are under site prep that will rise at least .

Tallest buildings: approved, site plan under review or proposed
There are 14 high-rises approved or proposed for construction that are planned to rise at least .

Timeline of tallest buildings
Nine different structures have held the title of tallest building in Phoenix, beginning with the Arizona State Capitol in 1900.

Notes
A. Using a threshold of 115 feet.
B. This building was originally known as the First National Bank Plaza but has since been renamed Wells Fargo Plaza.
C. This building was originally known as the Valley Bank Center.  The name was later changed to Bank One Center, but has been known as Chase Tower since 2005.

References
General
Emporis.com – Phoenix
Specific

External links

 Diagram of Phoenix skyscrapers on SkyscraperPage
 

Tallest in Phoenix
Phoenix
.Tallest